The Hangman is a 1959 film directed by Michael Curtiz. It stars Robert Taylor and Tina Louise. The film is based on the short story of the same name by Luke Short.

Plot
Deputy U.S. Marshal Mac Bovard, known as the Hangman for his success at seeing guilty men die for their crimes,  rounds up three of four outlaws suspected in a robbery that resulted in murder. Two are hanged. The third is needed to identify John Butterfield, whose face Bovard has never seen. Due to be hanged soon, the third outlaw refuses to cooperate. Knowing that Butterfield had been a U.S. Army cavalry trooper, Bovard goes to Butterfield's former post, Fort Kenton, to get assistance from the Army in identifying Butterfield.

Butterfield's former girlfriend, Selah Jennison, works at Fort Kenton doing laundry. She refuses to help Bovard, even when he offers a $500 reward. Butterfield had been there for her after the death of her husband, so she remains loyal to him.

A freight driver, Johnny Bishop, could be the man Bovard is seeking, but kindly sheriff Buck Weston warns him that Bishop is one of the most well-liked men in town. Selah comes to warn the married and respectable Bishop, who is Butterfield. He swears to her that he merely watched the outlaws' horses, not knowing they were pulling a holdup.

After Bovard persuades Bishop to surrender, Selah mocks the marshal, calling him "hangman" and claiming he is not interested in the truth. Bovard reveals to her that 20 years earlier he had been on the way to California to be a lawyer, accompanied by his brother. Their stagecoach was robbed by outlaws, who killed Bovard's brother. Bovard became a lawman and apprehended all of the murderers of his brother. They were subsequently hanged.

Bishop is broken out of jail, but Bovard allows him to escape by shooting at and deliberately missing Bishop as he rides away. Selah realizes what he has done. Bovard then tells Selah and Buck that he is quitting his job as a Deputy Marshal in order to take the stagecoach to California and become a lawyer as he had intended so many years earlier. Buck wants to marry Selah, but she is beholden now to Bovard, and boards the stage to go to California with him.

Cast
 Robert Taylor as Mac Bovard
 Tina Louise as Selah Jennison
 Fess Parker as Buck Weston
 Jack Lord as Butterfield / Bishop
 Gene Evans as Big Murph Murphy
 Mickey Shaughnessy as Al Cruse
 Betty Lynn as Molly

See also
 List of American films of 1959

References

External links

1959 films
1959 Western (genre) films
American black-and-white films
American Western (genre) films
Films based on short fiction
Films directed by Michael Curtiz
Films scored by Harry Sukman
Paramount Pictures films
Films with screenplays by Dudley Nichols
1950s English-language films
1950s American films

Films about capital punishment